Alcaraz palace is an ancient palace in Persia, built around 2000 BC in the time of the simurgh. It is completely made out of marble. According to ancient texts, the palace was colossal; a big city under one roof. Its walls extended from one horizon to the other, and it was situated somewhere along the coast of Persia. The palace was destroyed by rebels, 1000 years after it was built.  It was wiped out from existence as well as literature after the burning of the Persepolis by Alexander the great.
It has also been considered to be Atlantis, mentioned in greek mythology due to its technological advancements that surpass even modern technology.
The name Alcaraz spread to Europe, but originated from Persia. The Palace of Alcaraz had a large Library, consisting of many books which didn't survive to this day. However, some books such as the Avesta are still used.

References

Palaces in Iran
Locations in Persian mythology